Westniederdeutsch (lit. West Low German) is a variety of Northern Low German, which is a group of Low German. It is not to be confused with the grouping West Low German, also called Westniederdeutsch in Standard High German, which includes other varieties. It is spoken in the German states of Lower Saxony and North Rhine-Westphalia. 
Its varieties in Germany border to Northern Low Saxon, Low Franconian, Westphalian, and Eastphalian. It is spoken in Germany up to about the Ruhr area.  Westniederdeutsch is quite atypical for dialects in Germany in general. It has contact to the Dutch language. 
Most people in the area of Westniederdeutsch do not speak this variety.

References

Culture of Lower Saxony
German dialects
Low German
Languages of Germany
North Rhine-Westphalia